Bangui, officially the Municipality of Bangui, is a 4th class municipality in the province of Ilocos Norte, Philippines. According to the 2020 census, it has a population of 15,019 people.

The first power generating windmill farm in Southeast Asia, commonly known as Bangui Wind Farm, is found in the municipality of Bangui.

History 
Bangui was first founded in 1786, and was formally given its current status as a municipality in 1913.

Bangui was one of the Ilocos region municipalities where various human rights violations were documented during the martial law era, despite public perception that the region was supportive of the Marcos administration. Eight farmers in Bangui are documented to have been "salvaged" in 1984, the same year as three indigenous community members in Vintar, while farmers from the towns of Vintar, Dumalneg, Solsona, Marcos and Piddig were also documented to have been tortured.

The Bangui Wind Farm project of NorthWind Power Development Corp. (NorthWind) began commercial operation in 2005, eventually becoming a major tourist site for Bangui. Ayala-owned AC Energy eventually took control of Northwind and of the Bangui Wind Farm in 2017, acquiring a total of 67.79% of Northwind stocks.

Geography 

Barangays 
Bangui is politically subdivided into 14 barangays. These barangays are headed by elected officials: Barangay Captain, Barangay Council, whose members are called Barangay Councilors. All are elected every three years.

 Abaca 
 Bacsil
 Banban
 Baruyen
 Dadaor
 Lanao
 Malasin 
 Manayon 
 Masikil Clasheras
 Nagbalagan
 Payac
 San Lorenzo (Poblacion)
 Taguiporo
 Utol

Note: Bangui's Barangay San Isidro, by the decision of Supreme Court over the disputed barangay, was transferred to Dumalneg on August 10, 2012.

Climate

Demographics

Economy

Government

Bangui, belonging to the first congressional district of the province of Ilocos Norte, is governed by a mayor designated as its local chief executive and by a municipal council as its legislative body in accordance with the Local Government Code. The mayor, vice mayor, and the councilors are elected directly by the people through an election which is being held every three years.

Elected officials

Attractions

Bangui is well known because of its wind farm, which is the town's main attraction. Although the Burgos and Caparispisan (Pagudpud) Windmills were built in 2013, many visitors still visit Bangui Windmills.

Bangui Bay is also a tourist spot, yet not practical for swimming because of its deepness and water currents, but it is beautiful to view. There is also Abang Falls that can be found in Barangay Lanao, also a tourist spot. Bangui is also good for its beautiful view of mountains and rivers.

Other attractions include:
Municipal Plaza
Bolo River (locally known Caramuangen River)
Bangui Bay View Building
Baruyen Dam
Bangui's woodcraft windmills souvenir stores
Suacan Spring
Sentinella Hill
Abang Falls

Notable personalities
 Gen. Roy Cimatu - Secretary of DENR, 2017-2022 and Chief of Staff of the Armed Forces of the Philippines, 2002

References

External links

[ Philippine Standard Geographic Code]
Philippine Census Information
Local Governance Performance Management System

Municipalities of Ilocos Norte